Saturday Night Wrist is the fifth studio album by American alternative metal band Deftones, released on October 31, 2006, by Maverick Records. Despite early contributions that were later scrapped, it marked the departure of mainstay Deftones producer Terry Date. It was also the last Deftones album to feature bassist Chi Cheng, as well as the last album of his career and his lifetime, prior to being involved in a serious car accident in 2008, which put him in a coma. He eventually died five years later from cardiac arrest.

Saturday Night Wrist was the product of an arduous and stressful creative process lasting roughly two years and straining relationships within the band. Complicating matters and inspiring many of its songs were frontman Chino Moreno's drug addictions and the crumbling of his marriage. The final result was an album met with critical praise.

Background

Early writing and recording
In early 2004, Maverick Records told Deftones they needed to head into the studio due to the lackluster sales of the band's self-titled effort. They began pioneering ideas for a new album at their studio, The Spot, in Sacramento, California. On April 30, 2004, they announced they would be relocating to Malibu, California, to continue writing the album at Morning View House, famous for being the place that Incubus recorded their fourth album, Morning View. Deftones spent most of the summer there, resulting in an album's worth of material that Moreno described as "straight evil music".

They then began searching for a producer and started recording. They initially considered enlisting Ken Andrews of Failure and Ric Ocasek of the Cars, but to no avail. They then worked with Dan the Automator for about a week. According to guitarist Stephen Carpenter, during collaboration with Dan, Deftones seemed to be pursuing the "more technical", math metal-based elements of the band's sound. After some deliberation, however, Moreno and drummer Abe Cunningham successfully pushed for working with producer Bob Ezrin (Pink Floyd, Alice Cooper, Kiss) and engineer Brian Virtue.

Deftones then took a short break before planning a month-long tour with Dredg and C-Minus to road-test some material starting in San Francisco, California, and ending in Hartford, Connecticut, near where Ezrin's studio was located. Recording of the album began in November 2004. During the sessions, tensions mounted within the band and between singer Moreno and producer Ezrin. Moreno eventually jumped ship to continue work on his side project Team Sleep while the rest of the band continued recording. The Ezrin sessions concluded before Christmas and the band relocated back to their home base in Sacramento to take a break.

In early 2005, Deftones started tweaking the Ezrin material with Virtue at their studio The Spot, writing several new songs in the process. Moreno decided to take a break from recording in the spring to tour with Team Sleep, who were also releasing their long-awaited debut album. Moreno claimed that this was good for him, as he was somewhat unable to focus on the recording sessions due to his speed and alcohol addictions, as well as the dissolution of his longtime marriage to wife Celeste.

Hiatus
The rest of the band, while anxious to finish the album, decided it would be best to take a break from music. During the hiatus, Deftones released a 10-year anniversary CD/DVD, titled B-Sides & Rarities, on October 4, 2005. It included one of the songs from the Virtue sessions, a cover of "Wax and Wane" by Cocteau Twins. In late 2005, Moreno met with Date to help record vocals for some of the remaining tracks. The band also managed to quickly record a cover of John Lennon's "Jealous Guy" for Amnesty International as well as an iTunes exclusive cover of the Cars' "Drive".

Continuation on production
In early 2006, all previously recorded vocals were scrapped and the band started working on the album again with longtime friend Shaun Lopez (of Far and the Revolution Smile) acting as producer. The album was edited by Ryan Gorman. Finally, with all recording finished in April 2006, the album was mixed by Ryan Williams.

The album featured musical contributions from Annie Hardy of Giant Drag and Serj Tankian of System of a Down; the latter also contributed to the writing of one song, "Mein".

Carpenter stated in interviews that a significant portion of the songs were based on ideas by Moreno and that "Pink Cellphone", minus Hardy's vocals, was "all Chino". In fact, Moreno plays second guitar on many of the songs, including "Hole in the Earth", "Beware", "Cherry Waves", "U,U,D,D,L,R,L,R,A,B,Select,Start", "Xerces" and "Rivière". However, Moreno stated that "Rats!Rats!Rats!" was "all Stephen". Carpenter wrote and recorded all guitar parts on "Rapture", "Rats!Rats!Rats!" and "Kimdracula", but also played guitar and wrote guitar parts for all songs except "U,U,D,D,L,R,L,R,A,B,Select,Start", where he played drums and Moreno played guitar. The title for the latter song was a reference to the Konami Code, a famous video game cheat code.

The writing and recording process of Saturday Night Wrist was fraught and placed strain on the relationships within the band. Moreno stated that making it was "a seriously unhealthy experience", and that it "dragged on without much direction". Following its creation, after leaving to work on Team Sleep, he stated that he "wasn't sure if [he] was going to return".

Lyrical themes
Moreno described the lyrical subject matter of some of the songs in later interviews. He explained that "Kimdracula" was part of his email address at the beginning of making the record, during his heavy drug-use phase. "Beware" was a warning to others about sex, drugs and drinking, which were the three main problems he encountered during the album's creation. A story about a witch that Moreno wrote during his drug phase was told in "Rivière". "Cherry Waves" was about testing the trust a person has in someone else. The confusion Moreno experienced when making Saturday Night Wrist was illustrated in the song "Rapture". Communication issues between the divided band, during the making of the album, were captured in "Hole in the Earth".

Moreno explained the record's title as being a reference to the nerve damage caused when an intoxicated person falls asleep on their arm. He elaborated on the title, referencing "when you're alone on Saturday nights and your only best friend is your shaking wrist".

Release
Saturday Night Wrist was released on October 31, 2006. It was leaked on the Internet on October 13, over two weeks prior to its release. Lead single "Hole in the Earth" was sent to radio on October 16.

A collection of 16 demos from the Ezrin sessions later became available online, containing rough vocal mixes of "Cherry Waves" and "Combat", an instrumental version of what would become "Finger of Death", and several instrumentals recorded by the band without Moreno that did not make the final cut.

The iTunes version included the cover of "Drive" by the Cars, which featured producer Lopez as well as a prominent sample of Massive Attack's track "Protection" (from their album of the same name).

Critical reception

Saturday Night Wrist received generally positive reviews, earning a score of 72 at Metacritic.
Alternative Press gave the album a perfect score, stating "'Saturday Night Wrist' proves yet again that Deftones have a corner on the transcendental-metal market". Drowned in Sound also gave it a positive review, saying: "If you've even the slightest interest in 'heavy' music, you simply must make Saturday Night Wrist an integral part of your record collection".

The A.V. Club gave it a positive review, stating: "The album is mostly a heady, atmospheric, willfully too-difficult-for-radio wash of sound that, save for a handful of tracks, stretches out and explores Deftones' creative limits more than ever before". Similarly, Adrien Begrand of PopMatters concluded: "For the most part, Saturday Night Wrist has the Deftones improving on all fronts, whether it's Moreno's stirring vocal work or the band's improved versatility [...] The process might have been painstaking, but it appears that after all that work, the band is closer to a realized sound than ever before."

Another positive review came from AllMusic, which said that "these songs, as diverse as they are, are utterly disciplined sonically. They have all the tension and dynamic, all the immediacy of yore, but the mix is spacious, and Chino Moreno's vocals soar above it". A less enthusiastic, although positive, review came from Rolling Stone'''s Christian Hoard, who compared the band's "space-rock overlays" with Radiohead, but stated that "The songwriting never quite comes together, but this is a metal record that gets by as much on sonic tricks as monster riffs". Hoard nonetheless noted that the album was "viscerally shaking" and "artfully alluring," noting that "it's as dark as the Deftones have ever gotten, with sludgy stoner-rock bumping against prog-metal chops and scorched-earth atmospherics." Spin called the album "a sideways step in the right direction".PopMatters also noted that the band delved deep into shoegaze on the song "Cherry Waves". In 2016, Jonathan Dick of NPR Music retrospectively described the album as containing "math metal tendencies". The same year, Consequence of Sound placed the album's post-rock-influenced instrumental track, "U,U,D,D,L,R,L,R,A,B,Select,Start", at No. 15 in their list "The Top 20 Deftones Songs", describing the song as a "jazzy instrumental [that] ebbs and flows unlike anything else the band’s ever produced, a credit to the song’s bizarre instrumentation". PopMatters had also previously praised "U,U,D,D,L,R,L,R,A,B,Select,Start" as proof of Deftones' musical versatility.

Track listing
All songs written by Deftones except where noted. "Pink Cellphone" is 3:54 on the clean album version.

Personnel
Deftones
Chino Moreno − lead vocals, rhythm guitar
Stephen Carpenter − lead guitar, drums on "U,U,D,D,L,R,L,R,A,B,Select,Start", keyboard on "Beware", bass on "Beware" and "Xerces"
Chi Cheng − bass, backing vocals
Frank Delgado − keyboards
Abe Cunningham − drums

Additional musicians
Serj Tankian − additional vocals on "Mein"
Annie Hardy − additional vocals on "Pink Cellphone"

Production
Produced by Bob Ezrin and Deftones
Vocals produced and additional production by Shaun Lopez
Recorded and engineered by Brian Virtue and Brian Humphrey
Drums on "Beware" recorded by Joe Johnston
Assisted by Robert "Flossy" Cheek at The Spot, Sacramento, and The Hangar, Sacramento
Pro Tools engineer: Ryan Gorman
Recorded at the Carriage House, Stamford, Connecticut; The Spot, Sacramento; The Airport, Burbank, California; The Hangar, Sacramento; Morning View House, Malibu, California
Mixed by Ryan Williams
Mixed at Pulse Recordings, Los Angeles, California and Westlake Recording Studios, Los Angeles, California
Assistant mix engineer at Westlake Recording Studios: Brian Warwick
Mastered by Howie Weinberg at Masterdisk, New York, NY
Creative direction and design: Frank Maddocks
Photography by Lego
Images from the motion picture Roxanna'' courtesy of Retro-Seduction Cinema

Charts

Album

Singles

References

2006 albums
Deftones albums
Maverick Records albums
Albums produced by Bob Ezrin